Youri Jigounov, is a Russian comic writer and artist.
.

Works

Attached to a non-album series:
Yuri Jigounov only:
Series "Alpha"
Yuri Jigounov (drawings) and Pascal Renard (scenario):
 1996: The Exchange, The Lombard al. "Third Wave", Brussels, 1997, 48 p., (reissue March 1999).
 January 1997: Clan Bogdanov, The Lombard al. "Third Wave", Brussels, 1997, 48 p., (reissue March 2001).
Yuri Jigounov (drawings) and Mythic (scenario):
 January 1998: The Wages of wolves, The Lombard al. "Third Wave", Brussels, 1998, 48 p., (reissue March 2001).
 March 1999: The List, The Lombard al. "Third Wave", Brussels, 1999, 48 p., (reissue December 2000).
 October 2000: Sanctions, Le Lombard, et al. "Third Wave", Brussels, October 2000, 48 p.,.
 April 2002: The Emissary The Lombard al. "Third Wave", Brussels, 2002, 48 p.,.
 October 2003: Snow White, 30 seconds!, Le Lombard, coll. "Third Wave", Brussels, 2003, 48 p.,.
 November 2004: Games of powerful, Le Lombard, et al. "Third Wave", Brussels, 2004, 48 p.,.
 September 15, 2006: Scala, Le Lombard, et al. "Third Wave", Brussels, 2006, 48 p..
 11 May 2007: Lies, The Lombard al. "Third Wave", Brussels, 2007, 48 p..
Yuri Jigounov (drawings and screenplay)
 September 10, 2009: Fucking patriot, Le Lombard, et al. "Third Wave", Brussels, 2009, 56 p..
The first three albums of the Alpha series were reissued on 3 November 2005, grouped under the heading "Alpha Integral: An agent in Moscow," The Lombard al. "Third Wave", Brussels, 2005, 146 p..

References

1967 births
Living people